Matěj Hadaš (born 25 November 2003) is a Czech footballer who currently plays as a forward for Sigma Olomouc.

Career statistics

Club

Notes

References

2003 births
Living people
Czech footballers
Czech Republic youth international footballers
Association football forwards
Czech First League players
Bohemian Football League players
TJ Valašské Meziříčí players
SK Sigma Olomouc players